Embadium is a genus of flowering plants belonging to the family Boraginaceae.

Its native range is Central and Southern Australia.

Species:

Embadium jobnstonii 
Embadium stagnense 
Embadium uncinatum

References

Boraginoideae
Boraginaceae genera